INS Khanderi (S22) was a  diesel-electric submarine of the Indian Navy.

Khanderi was built at Sudomekh, Admiralty Shipyard and commissioned in the navy in December 1968 and decommissioned from service in 1989. The hull was scrapped, but her fin was preserved at Virbahu parade grounds.

The submarine was named after Maratha emperor Shivaji's island fort of Khanderi.

References

Foxtrot-class submarines
Ships built in the Soviet Union
1968 ships
Kalvari-class submarines